Hadži Milutin Savić Garašanin (1762–1842) was a Serbian revolutionary, obor-knez of Jasenica, and member of the National Council under Miloš Obrenović. He is the father of Ilija Garašanin and grandfather of Milutin Garašanin (1845-1898), one of the founders and leaders of Serbian Progressive Party.

Life
Savić was born in the village of Garaši, south of Belgrade. His father Sava "Saviša" Bošković settled in Garaši from Bjelopavlići (in  Montenegro). His paternal great-grandfather Vukašin Bošković was a knez of the Bošković brotherhood in Bjelopavlići.

He participated in the Freikorp of the Austrian Army in the Koča's frontier, in the same unit as Karađorđe.

See also
 List of Serbian Revolutionaries
 Avram Petronijević
 Toma Vučić-Perišić 
 Dimitrije Davidović
 Aleksa Simić 
 Ilija Garašanin

References

The memoirs of Prota Matija Nenadović
The first Serbian uprising and the restoration of the Serbian state
Michael Boro Petrovich, A history of modern Serbia, 1804-1918: Volume 1; Volume 1, Harcourt Brace Jovanovich, 1976
Војислав Суботић, Memorijali oslobodilačkih ratova Srbije, Book 1, Volume 1, Vlada Republike Srbije, Ministarstvo rada, zapošljavanja i socijalne politike, 2006

19th-century Serbian nobility
Serbian revolutionaries
People of the First Serbian Uprising
People of the Second Serbian Uprising
Šumadija
1762 births
1842 deaths